The Japanese Manchurian Army was an Army Group formed from 1904–1905 during the Russo-Japanese War, as a temporary command structure to coordinate the efforts of several Japanese armies in the campaign against Imperial Russia.

History  

The Japanese Manchurian Army was established as a local General command in June 1904 during the Russo-Japanese War. It was set up three months after the start of the war, because of the necessity to have a local command structure closer to the armies, after the operational theater had moved inland. The Army's headquarters was first located in Kaiping, and on August 22, 1904 it moved to Haicheng. 

Field Marshal Iwao Oyama became Supreme Commander and General Kodama Gentarō Chief of Staff of the Army.
The staff also included
 Yasumasa Fukushima, in charge of intelligence
 Tanaka Giichi, aide to General Kodama Gentarō

Composition of the Army Group  
 
 First Army (Kuroki Tamemoto)
 Second Army (Yasukata Oku)
 Third Army (Nogi Maresuke)
 Fourth Army (Nozu Michitsura)
 Ryodong Defensive Force (Nishi Kanjirō)
 Yalu River Army (Kageaki Kawamura)

Sources 
 Ikuhiko Hata, "Japan Army Encyclopedia," 2nd edition, the University of Tokyo Press, 2005.
 Toyama Misao Morimatsu, edited by "Imperial Army Formation directory" Fuyo Shobo Shuppan, 1987.

Manchurian
Manchurian
Military units and formations established in 1904
Military units and formations disestablished in 1905